Moonbathing on Sleeping Leaves is the fourth album by Sky Cries Mary, released in 1997 through Warner Bros. Records. It was the band's first album for a major label.

Production
The album was produced by Paul Fox and the band. Krist Novoselic contributes acoustic bass to one song.

Critical reception
The Encyclopedia of Popular Music called Moonbathing on Sleeping Leaves "an impressively diverse album that experimented with ambient and trance grooves." The Lincoln Journal Star called it "mesmerizing," writing that the band "creates its fascinating, lush sound mixture by playing everything - from farfisa organ and Moog synthesizer to finger cymbals, castanets and, literally, the kitchen sink."

Track listing

Personnel 
Sky Cries Mary
Michael Cozzi – guitar
Juano Davison – bass guitar
Bennett James – drums, percussion
Gordon Raphael – guitar, synthesizer, sampler, organ
Todd Robbins – sampler, turntables, vocoder, synthesizer, drum machine
Anisa Romero – vocals, harmonium, painting
Roderick Wolgamott Romero – vocals, synthesizer
Production and additional personnel
Paul Fox – production
Stephen Marcussen – mastering
Sky Cries Mary – production
Ed Thacker – engineering, mixing

References

External links 
 

1997 albums
Albums produced by Paul Fox (record producer)
Sky Cries Mary albums
Warner Records albums